Arkansas Highway 93 (AR 93 and Hwy. 93) is a north–south state highway in Randolph County, Arkansas. The route of  runs from AR 90 north to the Missouri state line.

Route description
AR 93 begins at AR 90 northwest of Pocahontas. The route winds north through forested land before a junction with Arkansas Highway 231, which connects AR 93 and AR 251 in north Randolph County. Highway 93 continues north through the communities of Dalton and Elm Store before meeting the Missouri state line. The road enters Missouri as Supplemental route BB, also entering the Mark Twain National Forest. The route it two–lane, undivided for its entire length.

History

Arkansas Highway 93 was one of the original 1926 Arkansas state highways. The route ran north in Randolph County along its present-day alignment, without the Highway 231 junction (the highway was not yet designated). Highway 93's southern terminus was US 62, which was later rerouted south and now runs through Pocahontas, with the former alignment becoming Highway 90.

Major intersections

See also

 List of state highways in Arkansas

References

External links

093
Transportation in Randolph County, Arkansas